The following highways are numbered 497:

Ireland
  R497 road

Japan
  Japan National Route 497

United States
  Louisiana Highway 497
  Kentucky Route 497
  Maryland Route 497
  Farm to Market Road 497 (former)